My Almost Famous Family is a British children's television series produced by the BBC and originally aired between 12 September and 21 November 2009 on CBBC on BBC Two. The show was not recommissioned for a second series.

Premise
The 11-part series was about a blended family of five siblings and their parents who performed together as the house band, 'We're in Perfect Harmony', of a fictional chat show. It was written by a team of writers that included Gail Renard and Emma Reeves.

Production
Composer and performer Richie Webb, whose credits include the BBC Radio 4 series 15 Minute Musical, was the show's musical director.

The shows theme tune 'Almost Famous' was written by Richard Webb, Steve Young and Tom Nichols. Incidental music was written and recorded by Tim Baxter.

In other media
On 17 April 2010, the BBC launched the My Almost Famous Family interactive website on the CBBC website, which consisted of 16 interactive games, music videos, and songs from the show.

Cast
Rakie Ayola as Shalondra Swann, the family's matriarch (percussion and backing vocals)
Andrew Clover as Gary Swann, the family's patriarch (keyboard)
Angus Harrison as Hadley Terence Swann, Gary's son (lead guitar)
Naomi Battrick as Toyah Swann, Gary's daughter (cello and bass guitar)
Dominique Moore as Aretha Swann, Shalondra's daughter (lead vocals)
Matthew Jacobs Morgan as Isaac Swann, Shalondra's son (drums)
Rachel Brady as Martha Swann, Gary and Shalondra's daughter, who is deaf and uses sign language to communicate
Alan Ford as Terry Swann, Gary's father and the kids' grandfather
Alice Henley as Annabelle, host of The Totally Annabelle Show, on which the family play
Emily Joyce as Jill, Annabelle's mother and owner of the studio
Nick Rapson as Zac Macdonald

Episodes

References

External links
 
British Comedy Guide

2009 British television series debuts
2009 British television series endings
2000s British children's television series
BBC children's television shows
2000s British teen sitcoms
British television-related lists
Television series produced at Pinewood Studios
English-language television shows
Television shows set in London
Television series about families